This is a list of schools in the Saginaw Intermediate School District (SISD).  Most of Saginaw County, Michigan is served by the Saginaw Intermediate School District, which coordinates the efforts of local boards of education, but has no operating authority over schools. Local school boards in Michigan retain great autonomy over day-to-day operations.

Public schools
The communities of Saginaw County are served by twelve public school districts.

 *Note: Based on 2003-2004 student count data
 **Note: Based on 2013-2014 student count data
 ***Note: Based on 2012-2013 school year data
Key: K=Kindergarten; PK=Pre-kindergarten; UG=No grade levels ("ungraded"); n/a=Not applicable (typically an independent charter school); {blank}=Data not available

Private schools
The Saginaw Intermediate School District includes these private schools:

 *Note: Based on 2003-2004 school year data
 **Note: Based on 2013 school year data
 ***Note: Based on 2012-2013 school year data
Key: K=Kindergarten; PK=Pre-kindergarten; {blank}=Data not available

Charter schools
The Saginaw Intermediate School District includes these charter schools:

 *Note: Based on 2003-2004 student count data
 **Note: Based on 2013-2014 student count data
 ***Note: Based on 2012-2013 school year data
Key: K=Kindergarten; PK=Pre-kindergarten; {blank}=Data not available

Colleges
The Saginaw Intermediate School District includes these colleges:
 Davenport University (Saginaw campus)
 Delta College
 Saginaw Valley State University

Other agencies
The Saginaw Intermediate School District also includes these education agencies:

 *Note: Based on 2003-2004 student count data
 **Note: Based on 2013-2014 student count data
 ***Note: Based on 2012-2013 school year data
Key: K=Kindergarten; PK=Pre-kindergarten; N/A=Not applicable; {blank}=Data not available

Former schools
Schools which are no longer in use by the Saginaw Intermediate School District, or its member local school districts, include:

 *Note: Based on 2003-2004 school year data 
Key: K=Kindergarten; PK=Pre-kindergarten; {blank}=Data not available

References

High schools in Michigan
Middle schools in Michigan
Elementary schools in Michigan
 
Saginaw